Yélimané Airport  is an airport serving Yélimané, a desert town in the Kayes Region of Mali.

The Yelimane non-directional beacon (Ident: YE) is located on the field.

See also
Transport in Mali
List of airports in Mali

References

External links
 OurAirports - Yélimané
   Great Circle Mapper - Yélimané
 FallingRain - Yélimané
 Google Earth

Airports in Mali
Kayes Region